This is a list of people who have served as Lord Lieutenant of Mid Glamorgan. Before the division of the county on 1 April 1974, the Monarch was represented by the Lord Lieutenant of Glamorgan.
Sir Cennydd George Traherne, K.G., T.D.† 1 April 1974 – 1985
 Lieutenant of Mid Glamorgan Henry Lougher Knight 1 April 1974 – ? 
Douglas George Badham C.B.E. 16 December 1985 – 1989
Murray Adams McLaggan 5 March 1990 – 23 December 2002
Dame Kathrin Elizabeth Thomas 23 December 2003 – 2019
Peter Vaughan 17 April 2019 – present

† Also Lord Lieutenant of South Glamorgan and West Glamorgan. Each of the three Counties had a separate Lieutenant serving under the joint Lord Lieutenancy.  Three separate Lord Lieutenants were appointed on his retirement.

References

Glamorgan Mid
 
1974 establishments in Wales